The Alabang Housewives is a Philippine reality series that followed the lives of Pamela Spella and Vanessa Ishitani, former contestants on the first season of The Amazing Race Philippines. It started broadcasting on TV5 on January 14, 2013. Alabang is a barangay (ward) in Muntinlupa, which is a city in Metropolitan Manila.

The show aired its last episode on February 8, 2013.

Overview
Aside from showcasing aspects of their lives, the show also features the pair interviewing celebrities, people in the government (e.g. MMDA Chairman Francis Tolentino) and also features behind-the-scenes looks of other TV5 shows, (appearing on the sets of Wil Time Bigtime, Never Say Goodbye, etc.) and even special-themed segments of other shows (Chef vs Mom segment).

Main cast
 Pamela Spella - Pamela is one half of the Alabang Housewives Team that competed in the Amazing Race Philippines. Aside from working as a beauty consultant, Pamela also occupies her time on many hobbies that include painting, singing, dancing, writing, and decorating her home. She is married to an Italian and has two sons.
 Vanessa Ishitani - Vanessa is Pamela's best friend and team partner in the recent Amazing Race Philippines. An accomplished businesswoman, Vanessa spends her free time on shopping, ballroom dancing, and regular beauty treatments. She is currently separated from her Japanese husband with whom she has two kids.

See also
List of programs broadcast by TV5

References

2013 Philippine television series debuts
2013 Philippine television series endings
TV5 (Philippine TV network) original programming
Philippine reality television series
Filipino-language television shows